The First cabinet of Ólafur Jóhannesson in Iceland was formed 14 July 1971.

Cabinets

Inaugural cabinet: 14 July 1971 – 16 July 1973

First reshuffle: 16 July 1973 – 6 May 1974
Björn Jónsson replaced Hannibal Valdimarsson as Minister of Communications and Minister of Social Affairs.

Second reshuffle: 6 May 1974 – 28 August 1974
Magnús Torfi Ólafsson replaced Björn Jónsson as Minister of Communications and Minister of Social Affairs.

See also
Government of Iceland
Cabinet of Iceland

References

Olafur Johannesson, First cabinet of
Olafur Johannesson, First cabinet of
Olafur Johannesson, First cabinet of
Cabinets established in 1971
Cabinets disestablished in 1974
Progressive Party (Iceland)